The Bureau of Health Workforce is a part of the Health Resources and Services Administration (HRSA), of the United States Department of Health and Human Services.
HRSA programs train health care professionals and place them where they are needed most. Grants support scholarship and loan repayment programs at colleges and universities to meet critical workforce shortages and promote diversity within the health professions.

The Bureau was formed in May 2014, by merging the Bureau of Health Professions and Bureau of Clinician Recruitment and Service.

Key Facts 
 HRSA closely tracks trends in the national healthcare workforce, and issues targeted grants to colleges and universities for scholarship, student loan and debt repayment programs designed to stimulate interest in clinical specialties in which shortages are expected. About 8,000 students graduate each year from these HRSA-supported institutions — and one of every three goes to work serving the disadvantaged.
 HRSA promotes the recruitment, training and placement of minority candidates in Health Professional Shortage Areas (HPSAs) to ensure that the workforce is culturally sensitive and linguistically capable to serve patients of every background.
 HRSA is the lead federal agency responsible for collecting data, and certifying communities as Health Professional Shortage Areas. The designation takes into consideration such factors as the prevailing rate of poverty and infant mortality; the number of physicians per 1,000 residents; and travel distances to nearest available care. The HPSA designation determines eligibility for numerous federal and state aid programs, including the National Health Service Corps, Nursing Education Loan Repayment Program and Rural Health Clinic Certification.

History 
The Bureau of Health Manpower was formed within the U.S. Public Health Service in 1967, absorbing the Division of Nursing, which began in 1899, and the Division of Dental Public Health, which was formed in 1949.  From 1968–1973, it was part of the National Institutes of Health, and then was transferred to the Health REsources Administration.  In 1980, it was renamed the Bureau of Health Professions.

In May 2014, the Bureau of Health Professions merged with the Bureau of Clinician Recruitment and Service to form the Bureau of Health Workforce.

Nursing Recruitment and Retention Programs 
With a national workforce shortage of 1 million nurses projected by 2025, HRSA supports academic and continuing education projects designed to recruit and retain a strong nursing workforce.

Nurse Education, Practice, Quality and Retention Program 
Program funds are used to increase enrollment in nursing programs, expand nursing practice to improve access to primary health care in medically underserved communities, and support efforts to promote the retention of nurses in the workforce.

Advanced Education Nursing Program 
HRSA supports projects that enhance advanced nursing education and practice. This program encourages individuals to serve as nurse practitioners, clinical nurse specialists, nurse midwives, nurse anesthetists, nurse educators, nurse administrators or public health nurses.

Nursing Workforce Diversity Program 
To increase nursing education opportunities for individuals from disadvantaged backgrounds, the program provides stipends and scholarships, pre-entry preparation, and retention activities for minority nursing students, pre-nursing students, and students in elementary and secondary schools.

Other Health Professions Programs

Health Careers Opportunity Program 
The program is designed to increase the number of individuals from educationally and economically disadvantaged backgrounds who are studying and working in the health and allied health professions. This program also provides support needed to compete, enter, and graduate from health or allied health professions' schools, graduate programs in behavior and mental health, and programs to train physician assistants.

Centers Of Excellence 
The Centers of Excellence Program provides grants to health professional schools to support educational programs of excellence for underrepresented minority students. These programs strengthen our national capacity to train minority students in health professions.

Scholarships For Disadvantaged Students 
HRSA provides funds to individuals from disadvantaged backgrounds to improve their education and graduation rates and improve their ranks in the health professions.

Training Programs 
HRSA provides grants to institutions to expand the knowledge base of health professionals and support their continuing education. These funds also support students and faculty in programs designed to increase the number of nurses, pediatricians and primary care providers.

Area Health Education Centers 
Main article: Area Health Education Centers Program

HRSA supports a network of more than 200 community-based training sites in 47 states and the District of Columbia that provide educational services to students, faculty and practitioners in underserved areas with the aim of increasing the supply of qualified providers in those communities.

Geriatric Education Centers 
Through Geriatric Education Centers, HRSA helps educate and train health professional faculty, students and practitioners in the diagnosis, treatment and prevention of disease, disability and other health problems of the aged.

Public Health Training Centers 
The Public Health Training Centers Program strengthens the workforce by providing fundamental training in the core competencies of public health.

Children's Hospital Graduate Medical Education Payment Program 
The Children's Hospital Graduate Medical Education Payment Program provides federal support for direct and indirect graduate medical education of interns and residents in freestanding children's teaching hospitals.

Scholarship, Loan and Loan Repayment Programs

National Health Service Corps Loan Repayment Program 
for primary care medical, dental, and mental and behavioral health clinicians;

National Health Service Corps Scholarship Program 
for primary care medical and dental providers-in-training;

NURSE Corps Scholarship and Loan Repayment programs 
for registered nurses and RN students;

Faculty Loan Repayment Program 
for health professions faculty from disadvantaged backgrounds;

Scholarship and Loan Programs for Health Professions Schools

Health Professions Student Loans 
Accredited schools of dentistry, optometry, pharmacy, podiatric medicine and veterinary medicine are eligible.

Loans for Disadvantaged Students 
Accredited schools of allopathic or osteopathic medicine, dentistry, optometry, pharmacy, podiatric medicine and veterinary medicine are eligible.

Nursing Student Loans 
Accredited schools leading to a diploma, associate, baccalaureate or graduate degree in nursing are eligible.

Primary Care Loans 
Accredited schools of allopathic and osteopathic medicine are eligible for this program which requires loan recipients to serve in primary care.

Practitioner Data Banks

National Practitioner Data Bank 
The National Practitioner Data Bank is a clearinghouse that provides information to eligible organizations about malpractice payments, adverse licensure, clinical privilege, and other negative actions taken against health care practitioners and entities.

Healthcare Integrity and Protection Data Bank 
The Healthcare Integrity and Protection Data Bank was merged into the National Practitioner Data Bank as of May 6, 2013, in accordance with 78 FR 20473.

References

External links
Bureau of Health Workforce
 Health Workforce account on USAspending.gov

Health Resources and Services Administration
Economic planning
Health care occupations